Zionist General Council  (ZGC) (HaVa'ad HaPoel HaTzioni) is the supreme institution of the Zionist movement.

The ZGC was established in 1921 following a decision reached at the 11th World Zionist Congress. It is composed of members elected at the World Zionist Congress and representatives of Zionist organizations. The council has 25–30 members. The ZGC is responsible for implementing decisions reached at the World Zionist Congress and the administration of the Zionist movement.

In 2010, Helena Glaser, President of World WIZO, was unanimously elected chairperson  of the Zionist General Council at the 36th World Zionist Congress in Jerusalem.

Past chairmen  
 1921–1925: Tzvi-Peretz Hayot
 1925–1933: Leo Motzkin
 1935–1941: Menachem Ussishkin
 1946–1949: Stephen Samuel Wise
 1949–1959: Yosef Sprinzak
 1959–1961: Berl Locker
 1961–1968: Ya'akov Tzur
 1968–1971: Ehud Avriel
 1972–1978: Yitzhak Navon
 1978-1982: Yitzhak Peretz
 1983–2010: Rabbi Richard Hirsch

References

Zionist organizations
Jewish organizations established in 1921